Edwin G. Johnson (February 15, 1922 – May 6, 1999) was a Republican member of the Pennsylvania House of Representatives.

He was born in Altoona, Pennsylvania. He graduated from Altoona High School in 1941. The next year he joined the United States Army Air Forces where he served until the end of World War II. He then studied at Pennsylvania State University and the University of Pennsylvania. He worked as a supervisor with the Internal Revenue Service, the tax collecting army of the United States government. He was elected to the state legislature in 1978 for a term beginning in 1979. He served until 1993, deciding not to run for reelection in 1992.

He died in Las Vegas in 1999.

References

Republican Party members of the Pennsylvania House of Representatives
1999 deaths
1922 births
20th-century American politicians
United States Army Air Forces personnel of World War II
Pennsylvania State University alumni
University of Pennsylvania alumni